Pokhariya is a village development committee within the Morang District, Koshi Zone, Nepal. At the time of the 1991 Nepal census it had a population of 2078 people living in 376 individual households.

References

Village development committees in Morang District
Jahada, Morang